Ashagakartas is a rural locality (a selo) in Ullugatagsky Selsoviet, Suleyman-Stalsky District, Republic of Dagestan, Russia. The population was 190 as of 2010.

Geography 
Ashagakartas is located 8 km south of Kasumkent (the district's administrative centre) by road. Yukharikartas is the nearest rural locality.

References 

Rural localities in Suleyman-Stalsky District